Armazi stele may refer to:
Armazi stele of Vespasian (75 AD)
Armazi stele of Serapit (150 AD)